I Love You is a 1925 German silent drama film directed by Paul L. Stein and starring Liane Haid, Alfons Fryland, and Anny Ondra.

The film's sets were designed by the art director Heinrich Richter.

Cast

References

Bibliography

External links

1925 films
Films of the Weimar Republic
Films directed by Paul L. Stein
German silent feature films
German black-and-white films
UFA GmbH films
German drama films
1925 drama films
Silent drama films
1920s German films